Peter Eriksson (February 2, 1964 – July 30, 2014) was a Swedish curler.

Teams

References

External links
 

1964 births
2014 deaths
Swedish male curlers
20th-century Swedish people